Changa is a village in the Leh district of Ladakh, India. It is located in the Kharu tehsil, on the bank of the Indus River.

Demographics
According to the 2011 census of India, Changa has 58 households. The effective literacy rate (i.e. the literacy rate of population excluding children aged 6 and below) is 66.82%.

See also
 Kharoo
 Geography of Ladakh
 Tourism in Ladakh

References

Villages in Kharu tehsil